Bartholomew of Pisa may refer to:

Bartholomew Albizzi (died 1342), Franciscan hagiographer 
Bartholomew Rinonico (died  1401), Italian Franciscan and chronicler
Bartholomew of San Concordio, (died 1347) Dominican canon lawyer